Stormont  is a community in the Canadian province of Nova Scotia, located in the Municipality of the District of Guysborough in Guysborough County.

References
 Stormont on Destination Nova Scotia
 Country Harbour Loyalist Trail Waterside Site

Communities in Guysborough County, Nova Scotia
General Service Areas in Nova Scotia